Nathalie Dominique Françoise Pâque (born 11 May 1977, Liège) is a Belgian singer, best known for her participation on behalf of France in the 1989 Eurovision Song Contest.

Pâque was internally selected by channel Antenne 2 to represent France with the song "J'ai volé la vie" ("I've Stolen Life") in the 1989 Eurovision Song Contest, held in Lausanne, Switzerland on 6 May.  At five days short of her 12th birthday, Pâque was the youngest performer ever to take a lead vocal at Eurovision.  "J'ai volé la vie" finished in eighth place of the 22 entrants. In response to reservations expressed by a number of participating countries regarding Pâque's youth (and that of 1989 Israeli singer Gili, who was only slightly older), the European Broadcasting Union amended the Eurovision rules on age with effect from 1990.

Pâque released several singles and two albums in Belgium during the 1990s, and in recent years has appeared in stage musicals such as Titanic and Singin' in the Rain in Belgium and France.

Discography 
Singles
 1989: "J'ai volé la vie"
 1989: "Ils reviennent"
 1990: "Bébé bambou"
 1991: "Danse"
 1991: "Noël différent"
 1992: "Kiss Me" (with Daniel Mendy)
 1992: "Nous, c'est spécial"
 1993: "Laisse-moi voyager"
 1996: "C'est vrai...je t'aime"
 1996: "Je garderai pour toi"
 1998: "Mama, c'est l'heure"

Albums
 1996: C'est vrai...je t'aime
 1998: Chante-nous la vie

References

External links 
 Nathalie Pâque's Myspace page

1977 births
Living people
Eurovision Song Contest entrants of 1989
Eurovision Song Contest entrants for France
Musicians from Liège
Belgian child singers
21st-century Belgian women singers
21st-century Belgian singers
Walloon musicians